Upper Sackville is a Canadian rural community in Westmorland County, New Brunswick.Located in the Sackville Parish approximately 6 kilometres northwest of Sackville

History

Notable people

See also
List of communities in New Brunswick

References

Communities in Westmorland County, New Brunswick